The 57th Primetime Emmy Awards were held on Sunday, September 18, 2005, and were hosted by Ellen DeGeneres. The ceremony was broadcast on CBS. BBC America received its first major nomination this year.

The ceremony, which aired three weeks after Hurricane Katrina hit, featured a mini-telethon for Habitat for Humanity and gave DeGeneres more opportunity to use the ceremony to somberly remember the victims of the Gulf Coast. Opening the ceremony was the famous 1970's band Earth, Wind & Fire with a comedic version of "September", in collaboration with The Black Eyed Peas. The ceremony featured tributes to ABC-TV anchor Peter Jennings (who died seven weeks earlier) presented by rival anchors Dan Rather and Tom Brokaw, and to talk show host Johnny Carson (who died on January 23, 2005) by close friend and Late Show host David Letterman. Also, the show featured Emmy Idol, five segments in which famous TV stars performed popular TV theme songs in a format like American Idol.

Everybody Loves Raymond became the first comedy to have its final season win the Primetime Emmy Award for Outstanding Comedy Series since Barney Miller in 1982. The CBS comedy series also tied for the lead in major nominations and wins with ten and three, respectively. Freshman series Desperate Housewives became just the second series to earn three nominations in a lead acting category, joining The Golden Girls which had three nominations for Outstanding Lead Actress in a Comedy Series for four separate years. In the drama field, new series Lost won Outstanding Drama Series.

Actress Angela Lansbury received her eighteenth and most recent nomination. However, she failed to win causing her record losing streak to be extended.

Winners and nominees
Winners are listed first and highlighted in bold:

Programs

Acting

Lead performances

Supporting performances

Directing

Writing

Most major nominations
By network 
 HBO – 35
 NBC / CBS – 28
 ABC – 24
 Fox – 14

By program
 Everybody Loves Raymond (CBS) / Will & Grace (NBC) – 10
 Desperate Housewives (ABC) – 8
 Arrested Development (Fox) / Empire Falls (HBO) / Warm Springs (HBO) – 7
 Lost (ABC) – 6

Most major awards
By network 
 HBO / ABC – 7
 NBC / CBS – 5
 Fox / Comedy Central – 2

By program
  Desperate Housewives (ABC) / Everybody Loves Raymond (CBS) / The Life and Death of Peter Sellers (HBO) – 3
 Lost (ABC) / Boston Legal (ABC) / The Daily Show with Jon Stewart (Comedy Central) / The 58th Annual Tony Awards (CBS) / Warm Springs'' (HBO) – 2

Notes

In Memoriam

 Eddie Albert
 Anne Bancroft
 Mason Adams
 Barbara Bel Geddes
 William Bell
 Shana Alexander
 Dana Elcar
 Rodney Dangerfield
 Greg Garrison
 John Fiedler
 Ossie Davis
 Frank Gorshin
 Perry Lafferty
 Howard Morris
 James Doohan
 Paul Henning
 Brian Kelly
 Howard Keel
 Brock Peters
 Christopher Reeve
 Pat McCormick
 Herb Sargent
 Chris Schenkel
 Danny Simon
 Hal Sitowitz
 Michael Weisbarth
 Ruth Warrick
 Paul Winchell
 Jerry Orbach

References

External links
 Emmys.com list of 2005 Nominees & Winners
 

057
2005 television awards
2005 in Los Angeles
September 2005 events in the United States